Grouped data are data formed by aggregating individual observations of a variable into groups, so that a frequency distribution of these groups serves as a convenient means of summarizing or analyzing the data. There are two major types of grouping: data binning of a single-dimensional variable, replacing individual numbers by counts in bins; and grouping multi-dimensional variables by some of the dimensions (especially by independent variables), obtaining the distribution of ungrouped dimensions (especially the dependent variables).

Example 
The idea of grouped data can be illustrated by considering the following raw dataset:

The above data can be grouped in order to construct a frequency distribution in any of several ways. One method is to use intervals as a basis.

The smallest value in the above data is 8 and the largest is 34. The interval from 8 to 34 is broken up into smaller subintervals (called class intervals). For each class interval, the number of data items falling in this interval is counted. This number is called the frequency of that class interval. The results are tabulated as a frequency table as follows:

Another method of grouping the data is to use some qualitative characteristics instead of numerical intervals. For example, suppose in the above example, there are three types of students: 1) Below normal, if the response time is 5 to 14 seconds, 2) normal if it is between 15 and 24 seconds, and 3) above normal if it is 25 seconds or more, then the grouped data looks like:

Yet another example of grouping the data is the use of some commonly used numerical values, which are in fact "names" we assign to the categories. For example, let us look at the age distribution of the students in a class.  The students may be 10 years old, 11 years old or 12 years old.  These are the age groups, 10, 11, and 12.  Note that the students in age group 10 are from 10 years and 0 days, to 10 years and 364 days old, and their average age is 10.5 years old if we look at age in a continuous scale. The grouped data looks like:

Mean of grouped data 
An estimate, of the mean of the population from which the data are drawn can be calculated from the grouped data as:

In this formula, x refers to the midpoint of the class intervals, and f is the class frequency. Note that the result of this will be different from the sample mean of the ungrouped data. The mean for the grouped data in the above example, can be calculated as follows:

Thus, the mean of the grouped data is

The mean for the grouped data in example 4 above can be calculated as follows:

Thus, the mean of the grouped data is

See also
Aggregate data
Data binning
Partition of a set
Level of measurement
Frequency distribution
Discretization of continuous features

References

Descriptive statistics
Statistical data coding